Lavariya is a popular traditional Sri Lankan sweet dumpling. It is essentially caramelised coconut wrapped in a string hopper (Idiyappam). It is usually served at breakfast or in the afternoon with tea and bananas.

Preparation
The dish is prepared by mixing rice flour with hot water, oil and seasoned with salt. It is then kneaded into a smooth dough. The dough mixture is used to fill an 'idiyappam' press or a sieve and the thin vermicelli-style noodles are pressed out onto banana leaves. The filling (Pol Pani) is a mix of grated coconut with moong dal and jaggery syrup, which is then placed inside the rice flour noodles in the shape of a half moon, then wrapped in banana leaves and steamed before serving.

See also 
 Sri Lankan cuisine
 String hoppers
 Pol Pani
 Kozhukkatta

References 

Sri Lankan rice dishes
Steamed foods
Tamil cuisine
Sri Lankan noodle dishes
Foods containing coconut
Sri Lankan snack food